The Asian and Oceanian Zone is one of the three zones of regional Davis Cup competition in 2007.

In the Asian and Oceanian Zone there are four different groups in which teams compete against each other to advance to the next group.

Participating teams

Draw

 relegated to Group II in 2008.
 and  advance to World Group play-off.

First Round Matches

Chinese Taipei vs. Thailand

China vs. Japan

Uzbekistan vs. India

South Korea vs. Kazakhstan

Second Round Matches

Japan vs. Thailand

South Korea vs. Uzbekistan

First-round play-offs

Chinese Taipei vs. China

Kazakhstan vs. India

Second-round play-offs

Kazakhstan vs. China

References
Draw

Asia/Oceania Zone Group I
Davis Cup Asia/Oceania Zone